Khuian Sarwar is a village in Fazilka district of Punjab, India. It is also the name of a block (sub-tehsil) within the Abohar tehsil. Khuian Sarwar is known for its kinnow, a type of orange. This area is the largest producer of kinnow in Punjab  and also known for cultivating cotton crop.
The villages under the administration of Khuian Sarawar gram panchayat include:

 Azam Wala
 Achadikki
 Alamgarh
 Bhanger Khera
 Bakkain Wala
 Bazidpur Kattian Wali
 Bareka
 Bandi Wala
 Bodhi Wala Peetha
 Chuhri Wala Dhana
 Dalmir Khera
 Danewala SatKosi
 Diwan Khera
 Dhani Harcharan Singh Randhawa
 Dhani Telupura
 Danghar Khera
 Giddranwali
 Ghumjal
 Ghallu
 Hari Pura alias Bara Tirath
 Jandwala Meera Sangla
 Jandwala Hanuwanta
 DaulatPura alias Jinhanwala
 Koel Khera
 Kabul Shah alias Khuban
 Kallar Khera
 Killianwali Lal Singh
 Khuian Sarwar
 Khipanwali
 Kheowali
 Kattehra
 KhuiKhera Mukha
 Lakhewali Dhab
 Maujgarh
 Muradwala Bhomgir 
 Nihal Khera
 Patti Bihla alias Nisripur
 Panniwala Mahla
 Panjawa
 Pattrewala
 PanjKosi
 Rup Nagar alias Rupana
 Ram Sukh Pura
 Ram Kot alias Bhed Kot
 Sarupewala alias Dharam Pura
 Sappan Wali
 Shiwana
 Sayad Wala
 Shateer Wala
 Subhana alias Chattan Wali
 Tutwala
 Tillanwali
 Usman Khera

References

Villages in Fazilka district